The Dauphin Kings are a Junior "A" ice hockey team from Dauphin, Manitoba, Canada.  They are members of the Manitoba Junior Hockey League (MJHL), a part of the Canadian Junior Hockey League (CJHL) and Hockey Canada. The Kings were established in 1967 and play at the Credit Union Place.

History

1967–68
In the fall of 1967 Dauphin, along with the Selkirk Steelers, Portage Terriers and Fort Garry Frontiersmen, started the Central Manitoba Junior Hockey League.

1968–69
After years of trying to secure an MJHL franchise Dauphin finally got its wish when the CMJHL and the MJHL merged for the 1968–69 season. The Kings opened the season with nine straight wins and remained undefeated for twelve games. All season long the Kings' battled with the Selkirk Steelers for first overall which came to a showdown on the very last night of the season at a head-to-head match in Dauphin. The Kings "blanked" them 4–0. The Kings were led by goaltender Ron Low loaned by the Winnipeg Jets of the Western Canada Hockey League. Bob Neufeld anchored the defense with Johnny Roy who gave the Kings an offensive flare from the blueline,  Ron Boyes, Farley Hemmings and Wayne Pockett. The first line of "Captain" Dennis Schick, Jim Cahoon and Bob Leguilloux would combine to score 93 goals during the season. Schick won the Scoring Championship, Cahoon came second and Leguilloux center Bob Buchy also finished in the top ten. Other forwards included Clayton Kemp (20 goals), Dennis Clarke, John Morrison, Gary Westbury, Peter Wood and 15-year-old Blaine Stoughton. Nearing the end of the season Butch Goring and his sidekick Merv Haney quit the Winnipeg Jets and joined the Kings.

The Goring affair
On Sunday February 9, 1969, the MJHL held a special emergency meeting to discuss Butch Goring leaving the Winnipeg Jets of the Western Canada Hockey League to join the Dauphin Kings. Goring had played the night before the meeting in Kenora for the Kings during a regular season game. Goring led the Kings to a win and scored 3 goals the Kings had signed Goring the Friday night after the Jets game. Learning of this MJHL president Bill Addison instructed the Kings not to use Goring in Sundays game. Another Jets forward Merv Haney also signed by the Kings and traveled to Kenora with the team but did not play in either game. The Kings won Sundays game 10–6.

At the meeting, which lasted three hours, the MJHL gave the Kings approval to use Goring in regular season and play-off games. After learning of the MJHL's approval Jets owner Ben Hatskin said "There are no ifs, ands or buts. The matter is in the hands of the lawyers and I'll likely seek an injunction to prevent him from playing in Dauphin". The WCHL president Ron Butlin said a court injunction would be sought against Goring and Haney from playing with Dauphin Kings. Butlin, also president of the Canadian Hockey Association, said the CHA would be "taking whatever action is necessary against Dauphin and the Manitoba Amateur Hockey Association for damages." Goring was leading the WCHL in goals at the time.

On Monday February 10, the MJHL approved the Kings signing of Haney. On Tuesday the Jets and the CHA filed in court seeking an injunction against Goring and Haney from playing for any club other than the Jets. On Wednesday Goring and Haney played for the Kings in an exhibition game against Weyburn Red Wings of the Saskatchewan Junior Hockey League. In the third period Goring suffered a broken wrist. Since the injunction hearing could not be heard until June it was dropped although the lawsuit for damages was not. Goring would return for the MJHL finals wearing a special cast. It was announced on July 31, as part of an agreement between the Canadian Amateur Hockey Association and the WCHL, that all legal issues in this matter were to be dropped.

'69 playoffs
Goring, with goaltender Ron Low, helped lead the Kings to the western Canadian final for the Memorial Cup to meet the Regina Pats of the Saskatchewan Junior Hockey League (SJHL). The Pats were led by goaltender Gary Bromley and eight future NHL draft picks, including Don Saleski, won the best of seven 4–3 with Goring missing game seven with a separated shoulder. Goring was picked up by Regina for the Memorial Cup finals and was voted the Pats best player in a losing effort as the Montreal Junior Canadiens, led by Marc Tardif and Gilbert Perreault, swept the Pats four straight.

For the 1969–70 season the Kings had a major rebuild, only Low and Bushy remained. Bushy was named captain. Rookie scoring sensation Ron Chipperfield was added and Dennis Clarke returned after spending most of the previous year on the injury list, to the give Kings the best one two punch in the league. Chipperfield as a 16-year-old rookie tied for the league lead in goals, and with Clarke, and Randy Sigurdson formed the Kings 2nd line. Bushy centered the 1st, with Dan Tremblay and Dave Marin. Barry Chernos was brought in, Herb Andres was elevated from the taxi squad, and Merv Kiryluik came from the Dauphin Minor Hockey Association to make up the third line. Peter Wood, became the tenth forward, after spending the previous year on the taxi squad. Bill Gidden anchored the defense with Ron Realini, Bernie Reid, Harvey Shaw, and Dauphinite Ron Lemieux, who added offensive from the blueline. The Kings breezed through the MJHL, in the final Low recorded 2 shutouts, allowed 3 goals, as the Kings swept in four straight. For the second straight year, the Kings faced the Westfort Hurricanes of Thunder Bay Junior Hockey League. And in a bitter fought series the Kings failed in 6 games.

1970–75
1970–71, the Kings once again needed to rebuild with only 4 returnees, Andres, Marin, Realini and Tremblay. Tremblay would be named captain and led the league in scoring with 109 Points. The Kings added forwards Jeff Berke, Brad Carefoot, Don Larway, Jim Miller, Bill Murray, Darrell Novakowski, Tom Sinclair, Ed Tkachuk, defenseman Mike Korney, Dan Lemieux, Perry Robinson and Drew Trapp. The biggest hole the Kings needed fill was goal. With Ron Low going to the pros the Kings brought in the tandem of Ty Langton and Larry Budzinski. Injuries were the biggest concern for the 1970–71 Kings and the Kings' season ended early.

The Kings entered the 1971–72 season with nearly a set team and the Kings were thinking championship, Budzinski and Langton were back in goal. Dauphinites Korney, Lemieux and Trapp would return to the blueline joined by Jack Osachuk and Dauphinite Greg Kiryluik. Up front the Kings had 7 returnees and Dauphinite Jim Cruise was added to the 1st line with Miller and Murray. Cruise would score 36 goals as a rookie and the line combined for 97 goals in a 48-game schedule. The line of Tkachuk, Marin and Carefoot would score 98 goals and be the Kings' 2nd line. Scott Hetherington, another Elm Creek boy, would center the 3rd with wingers Larway and Novakowski. Dauphinite Ken Buchy was the tenth forward, a position his older Bob had only a few years earlier. Miller would be named captain. Half a year in Bob Windatt quit the Winnipeg Jets of the WCHL and signed with the Kings. Windatt replaced Novakowski who had been traded. The Kings would win 40 games out 48, score 304 goals and appeared to be the best of the MJHL. The Kings would meet their Waterloo in the Saskatchewan Champions Humboldt Broncos.

During the 1974–75 season Dauphinite Jim Misener established a new MJHL record of 73 goals breaking Bobby Clarke's record of 71.

1977
Rebuilding since the run of 1971–72, the Kings had a veteran lineup for 1976–77. The Kings had three 100-point men, all of whom were in the top 5 in league scoring: Jim Misener (59 goals), Bob Genoway (47 goals) and Lyle Stokotelny (33 goals). Owen Connelly chipped in with 35 goals, add fellow veterans Cam Carefoot, Martin Dupont, Dan Greening, Rich Hopfner, Vernon Jebb, Dean Murray, Duke Rodnisky, and starting goalie Jim Tkachyk, who was entering his third season, and second as #1. Three veterans from other clubs, Calven Bernard, Brad Harding, Harvey Takvam and rookies Brock Bulbuck, Rich Little, Rick Peacosh, Ron Shewchuk and Greg Vertz. The Kings prevailed winning the Turnbull Cup for the 4th time in 10 years. The Kings' achilles heel had been getting past the Saskatchewan champs and the Prince Albert Raiders were not going to change that.

1983
In 1982–83 Mike Ridley of the St. Boniface Saints shattered Jim Misener's goal scoring record by 18, netting 91 goals. Kings' Brent Sapergia also surpassed Misener to establish a new team record of 77.

The Kings went on to win the Anavet Cup in 1983 by defeating the Saskatchewan Junior Hockey League's Yorkton Terriers but lost the Abbott Cup to the British Columbia Junior Hockey League's Abbotsford Flyers.

List of Championships

Season-by-season record
Note: GP = Games Played, W = Wins, L = Losses, T = Ties, OTL = Overtime Losses, GF = Goals for, GA = Goals against

Playoffs
1971 Lost Quarter-final
Kenora Muskies defeated Dauphin Kings 4-games-to-3
1972 Won League, Lost Man/Sask Championship
Dauphin Kings defeated Selkirk Steelers 4-games-to-none
Dauphin Kings defeated Portage Terriers 4-games-to-none
Dauphin Kings defeated West Kildonan North Stars 4-games-to-none MJHL CHAMPIONS
Humboldt Broncos (SJHL) defeated Dauphin Kings 4-games-to-2
1973 DNQ
1974 DNQ
1975 Lost Quarter-final
Portage Terriers defeated Dauphin Kings 4-games-to-none
1976 Lost Quarter-final
Selkirk Steelers defeated Dauphin Kings 4-games-to-1
1977 Won League, Lost Anavet Cup
Dauphin Kings defeated Thompson King Miners 4-games-to-none
Dauphin Kings defeated Brandon Travellers 4-games-to-none
Dauphin Kings defeated Kildonan North Stars 2-games-to-1 (series suspended) MJHL CHAMPIONS
Prince Albert Raiders (SJHL) defeated Dauphin Kings 4-games-to-1
1978 Lost Final
Dauphin Kings defeated Brandon Travellers 4-games-to-2
Dauphin Kings defeated Selkirk Steelers 4-games-to-3
Kildonan North Stars defeated Dauphin Kings 4-games-to-3
1979 Lost Quarter-final
Portage Terriers defeated Dauphin Kings 4-games-to-3
1980 Lost Semi-final
Dauphin Kings defeated Brandon Travellers 4-games-to-2
Selkirk Steelers defeated Dauphin Kings 4-games-to-1
1981 Lost Semi-final
Dauphin Kings defeated Kildonan North Stars 4-games-to-none
Selkirk Steelers defeated Dauphin Kings 4-games-to-1
1982 Lost Final
Dauphin Kings defeated Winkler Flyers 4-games-to-2
Dauphin Kings defeated Selkirk Steelers 4-games-to-none
Fort Garry Blues defeated Dauphin Kings 4-games-to-none
1983 Won League, Won Turnbull Cup, Won Anavet Cup, Lost Abbott Cup
Dauphin Kings defeated Portage Terriers 4-games-to-none
Dauphin Kings defeated Winkler Flyers 4-games-to-2
Dauphin Kings defeated St. Boniface Saints 4-games-to-1 MJHL CHAMPIONS
Dauphin Kings defeated The Pas Huskies (NJHL) 3-games-to-none TURNBULL CUP CHAMPIONS
Dauphin Kings defeated Yorkton Terriers (SJHL) 4-games-to-1 ANAVET CUP CHAMPIONS
Abbotsford Flyers (BCJHL) defeated Dauphin Kings 4-games-to-2
1984 Lost Semi-final
Dauphin Kings defeated Portage Terriers 4-games-to-none
Selkirk Steelers defeated Dauphin Kings 4-games-to-1
1985 Lost Quarter-final
Winkler Flyers defeated Dauphin Kings 4-games-to-3
1986 Lost Quarter-final
Selkirk Steelers defeated Dauphin Kings 4-games-to-1
1987 Lost Semi-final
Dauphin Kings defeated Portage Terriers 4-games-to-1
Selkirk Steelers defeated Dauphin Kings 4-games-to-3
1988 Lost Semi-final
Dauphin Kings defeated Winkler Flyers 4-games-to-1
Portage Terriers defeated Dauphin Kings 4-games-to-1
1989 Lost Semi-final
Dauphin Kings defeated Winkler Flyers 4-games-to-2
Selkirk Steelers defeated Dauphin Kings 4-games-to-1
1990 Lost Semi-final
Dauphin Kings defeated Selkirk Steelers 4-games-to-1
Portage Terriers defeated Dauphin Kings 4-games-to-1
1991 Lost Semi-final
Dauphin Kings defeated Selkirk Steelers
Winkler Flyers defeated Dauphin Kings 4-games-to-1
1992 Lost Quarter-final
Portage Terriers defeated Dauphin Kings 4-games-to-1
1993 Won League, Lost Anavet Cup
Dauphin Kings defeated Winkler Flyers 4-games-to-none
Dauphin Kings defeated Portage Terriers 4-games-to-1
Dauphin Kings defeated St. Boniface Saints 4-games-to-none MJHL CHAMPIONS
Flin Flon Bombers (SJHL) defeated Dauphin Kings 4-games-to-2
1994 Lost Semi-final
Dauphin Kings defeated Neepawa Natives 4-games-to-2
Winkler Flyers defeated Dauphin Kings 4-games-to-3
1995 Lost Quarter-final
Winkler Flyers defeated Dauphin Kings 4-games-to-3
1996 Lost Semi-final
Dauphin Kings defeated Winkler Flyers 4-games-to-1
Neepawa Natives defeated Dauphin Kings 4-games-to-2
1997 DNQ
1998 DNQ
1999 Lost Quarter-final
OCN Blizzard defeated Dauphin Kings 4-games-to-none
2000 Lost Semi-final
Dauphin Kings defeated Portage Terriers 4-games-to-none
OCN Blizzard defeated Dauphin Kings 4-games-to-none
2001 DNQ
2002 DNQ
2003 Lost Quarter-final
OCN Blizzard defeated Dauphin Kings 4-games-to-none
2004 DNQ
2005 Lost Quarter-final
Neepawa Natives defeated Dauphin Kings 4-games-to-2
2006 Lost Semi-final
Dauphin Kings defeated Portage Terriers 4-games-to-2
OCN Blizzard defeated Dauphin Kings 4-games-to-3
2007 Lost Final
Dauphin Kings defeated Waywayseecappo Wolverines 4-games-to-3
Dauphin Kings defeated Neepawa Natives 4-games-to-2
Selkirk Steelers defeated Dauphin Kings 4-games-to-1
2008 Lost Semi-final
Dauphin Kings defeated Waywayseecappo Wolverines 4-games-to-3
Portage Terriers defeated Dauphin Kings 4-games-to-none
2009 Lost Semi-final
Dauphin Kings defeated OCN Blizzard 4-games-to-2
Portage Terriers defeated Dauphin Kings 4-games-to-none
2010 Won League, Won Anavet Cup, Lost 2010 Royal Bank Cup final
Dauphin Kings defeated Neepawa Natives 4-games-to-none
Dauphin Kings defeated Swan Valley Stampeders 4-games-to-1
Dauphin Kings defeated Winnipeg Saints 4-games-to-none MJHL CHAMPIONS
Dauphin Kings defeated La Ronge Ice Wolves (SJHL) 4-games-to-1 ANAVET CUP CHAMPIONS
First in 2010 Royal Bank Cup round robin (4-0)
Dauphin Kings defeated La Ronge Ice Wolves (SJHL) 6-2 in semi-final
Vernon Vipers (BCHL) defeated Dauphin Kings 8-1 in final
2011 Lost Semi-final
Dauphin Kings defeated OCN Blizzard 4-games-to-3
Portage Terriers defeated Dauphin Kings 4-games-to-2
2012 Lost Quarter-final
Winnipeg Saints defeated Dauphin Kings 4-games-to-1
2013 Lost Final
Dauphin Kings defeated Waywayseecappo Wolverines 4-games-to-1
Dauphin Kings defeated OCN Blizzard 4-games-to-3
Steinbach Pistons defeated Dauphin Kings 4-games-to-2
2014 Lost Final, Western Canada Cup runner up, Lost RBC Cup semi-final
Dauphin Kings defeated OCN Blizzard 4-games-to-0
Dauphin Kings defeated Virden Oil Capitals 4-games-to-0
Winnipeg Blues defeated Dauphin Kings 4-games-to-1
First at the 2014 Western Canada Cup round robin (3-2) qualified as host
Yorkton Terriers (SJHL) defeated Dauphin Kings 5-3 in final
Dauphin Kings defeated Spruce Grove Saints (AJHL) 4-3 in runner-up game
First in the 2014 Royal Bank Cup round robin (4-0)
Carleton Place Canadians (CCHL) defeated Dauphin Kings 5-3 in semi-final
2015 Lost Survivor Series
Waywayseecappo Wolverines defeated Dauphin Kings 2-games-to-0
2016 Lost Survivor Series
Selkirk Steelers defeated Dauphin Kings 2-games-to-0
2017 DNQ
2018 DNQ
2019 Lost Quarter-final
Swan Valley Stampeders defeated Dauphin Kings 4-games-to-0
2020 Playoffs cancelled
Portage Terriers leading Dauphin Kings 2-games-to-1 when playoffs were cancelled due to COVID-19 pandemic
2021 Playoffs cancelled
2022 Won league, Lost Centennial Cup Semi-final
Dauphin Kings defeated Swan Valley Stampeders 4-games-to-2
Dauphin Kings defeated Winkler Flyers 4-games-to-1
Dauphin Kings defeated Steinbach Pistons 4-games-to-3 MJHL CHAMPIONS
Second at the 2022 Centennial Cup round robin (3-0-1)
Pickering Panthers (OJHL) defeated Dauphin Kings 2-0

Notable alumni
NHL Draft Picks:
Butch Goring selected by Los Angeles Kings in round 5 (#51) of 1969 NHL Amateur Draft
Bob Neufeld selected by Toronto Maple Leafs in round 6 (#67) of 1969 NHL Amateur Draft
Ron Low selected by Toronto Maple Leafs in round 8 (#103) of 1970 NHL Amateur Draft
Ron Lemieux selected by Pittsburgh Penguins in round 9 (#110) of 1970 NHL Amateur Draft
Jim Cahoon selected by Montreal Canadiens in round 3 (#31) of 1971 NHL Amateur Draft
Norm Cherrey selected by Vancouver Canucks in round 8 (#101) of 1971 NHL Amateur Draft
Blaine Stoughton selected by Pittsburgh Penguins in round 1 (#7) of 1973 NHL Amateur Draft
Mike Korney selected by Detroit Red Wings round 4 (#59) of 1973 NHL Amateur Draft
Ron Chipperfield selected by California Seals round 1 (#17) of 1974 NHL amateur draft
Don Larway selected by Boston Bruins round 1 (#18) of 1974 NHL amateur draft
Glen McLeod
Rick St. Croix selected by Philadelphia Flyers round 4 (#72) of 1975 NHL Amateur Draft
Scott Williams selected by Kansas City Scouts in round 9 (#145) of 1975 NHL Amateur Draft
Kelly Secord selected by Pittsburgh Penguins round 16 (#217) of 1975 NHL Amateur Draft
Jeff McDill selected by Chicago Blackhawks round 2 (#27) of 1976 NHL Amateur Draft
Tim Williams selected by Toronto Maple Leafs round 4 (#66) of 1976 NHL Amateur Draft
Dale Rideout selected by Washington Capitals round 7 (#109) of 1976 NHL Amateur Draft
Brad Church selected by Washington Capitals round 1 (#17) of 1995 NHL Entry Draft
Darcy Hordichuk selected by Atlanta Thrashers round 6 (#180) of 2000 NHL Entry Draft

Others:
Mel Angelstad
Dave Hrechkosy
Kirby Law
Jeffrey Penner signed by the Boston Bruins as a free agent
Barry Trotz

See also
List of ice hockey teams in Manitoba
Manitoba Junior Hockey League
Hockey Manitoba

References

External links
Dauphin Kings Official Website
Dauphin Kings Statistics and History at Hockeydb.com
Dauphin Kings at EliteProspects.com

1967 establishments in Manitoba
Manitoba Junior Hockey League teams
Sport in Dauphin, Manitoba
Ice hockey clubs established in 1967